Nadine El-Enany is a writer and legal scholar. She is Reader in Law, and Co-Director of the Centre for Research on Race and Law, at Birkbeck, University of London. She specializes in migration and refugee law, European Union law, protest and criminal law.

Life
Nadine El-Enany is the daughter of the Egyptian literary scholar Rasheed El-Enany. She gained her PhD, on refugee law in the United Kingdom and the European Union, in 2012 from the European University Institute in Italy.

After Grenfell (2019) was a co-edited collection of responses to the Grenfell Tower fire, emphasising the legacy of colonialism and UK immigration policy in explaining the racialized neglect of Grenfell residents. Bordering Britain (2020) argues that contemporary UK immigration law and policy need to be seen as "ongoing expressions of empire [...] an attempt to control access to the spoils of empire which are located in Britain".

As well as academic publications, El-Enany has also written for non-academic media outlets, including the London Review of Books and The Guardian.

Works
 (ed. with Dan Bulley and Jenny Edkins) After Grenfell : violence, resistance and response, 2019
 Bordering Britain: law, race and empire. Manchester: Manchester University Press, 2020.

References

Living people

Year of birth missing (living people)

English legal scholars
Immigration law scholars
Race and law
Academics of Birkbeck, University of London